Mallireddy Ajay Kumar (born 12 December 1989) is an Indian cricketer. He made his Twenty20 debut for Andhra in the 2015–16 Syed Mushtaq Ali Trophy on 10 January 2016.

References

External links
 

1989 births
Living people
Indian cricketers
Andhra cricketers
People from East Godavari district